Makis is a Greek masculine given name and nickname which may refer to:

 Mavroeidis Makis Angelopoulos (born 1964), Greek businessman and co-owner of the basketball team AEK Athens
 Makis Belevonis (born 1975), Greek former footballer
 Gerasimos Makis Dendrinos (1950–2015), Greek basketball player and coach
 Prodromos Makis Dreliozis (born 1975), Greek retired basketball player
 Makis Giannikoglou (born 1993), Greek football goalkeeper
 Gerasimos Makis Giatras (born 1971), Greek basketball coach
 Iacovos Makis Keravnos (born 1951), Cypriot banker and politician
 Prodromos Makis Nikolaidis (born 1978), Greek-Cypriot former basketball player
 Makis Papadimitriou, Greek actor
 Makis Papaioannou (born 1977), Cypriot former footballer
 Makis Solomos (born 1962), Franco-Greek musicologist
 Efthimios Makis Triantafyllopoulos (born 1954), Greek journalist and publisher
 Makis Tsitas (born 1971), Greek writer
 Kosmas Makis Tzatzos (born 1968), Greek retired footballer
 Mavroudis Makis Voridis (born 1964), Greek politician and lawyer
 Makis Voukelatos (born 1998), Greek footballer
 

Greek masculine given names
Lists of people by nickname